Colonel William Wollaston (1731, Finborough Hall, Great Finborough, Suffolk – 10 November 1797, Bath) was a British M.P. for Ipswich between 1768 and 1784.

He was born the eldest son of William Wollaston, MP and his wife Elizabeth Faquier and educated at Bury St Edmunds Grammar School.

Before gaining his position in Parliament, he served as colonel of the Eastern Battalion in the Suffolk Militia. He was a close friend of artist Thomas Gainsborough, with whom he shared a love of music. Gainsborough painted Wollaston's portrait in about 1758.  In 1794 to pay off a gambling debt Wollaston sold the family estate of Finborough Hall to Roger Pettiward (d.1833), whose family owned the neighbouring estate at Onehouse.

He was married to Blanche, daughter of Robert Hyde Page and sister of Sir Thomas-Hyde Page.  They had no children.

References

 John Bernard Burke, A Genealogical and Heraldic Dictionary of the Landed Gentry of Great Britain (1863) p. 1689
 John Nichols, Illustrations of the Literary History of the Eighteenth Century (1817) p. 834
 Augustine Page, John Kirby, A supplement to The Suffolk traveller [of J. Kirby] (Ipswich, 1844) p. 536

External links 
 Bookplate of William Wollaston Rare Books of the Shimeon Brisman Collection in Jewish Studies, Washington University

1730 births
1797 deaths
People from Great Finborough
Members of the Parliament of Great Britain for Ipswich
British MPs 1768–1774
British MPs 1774–1780
British MPs 1780–1784